The Belgian Open (name owned by the Royal Belgian Golf Federation) is a men's golf tournament which has been played intermittently from 1910 to 2000. All editions since 1978 have been part of the European Tour. After not having been played since 2000, it returned in 2018 as the Belgian Knockout, hosted by PietersProductions, along with its co-founder, Belgian professional golfer Thomas Pieters. With a prize pool set at €1 million, 144 professional golfers start the competition with 36 holes of stroke play, followed by 9-hole match play for the top 64 finishers from the stroke play rounds.

History
The first ever Belgian Open was played at the Royal Golf Club of Belgium, featuring 36 holes. It was not until 1928 that the competition format expanded to 72 holes. The first edition of the tournament was won by Arnaud Massy, the only Frenchman to win a major championship. Other distinguished champions included Walter Hagen, Henry Cotton, José María Olazábal, Nick Faldo and Lee Westwood. Belgium's most successful 20th century golfer, Flory Van Donck, won his home open five times between 1939 and 1956.

In 2018, PietersProductions took over the organisation of the Belgian Open. After an absence of 18 years, they brought the Belgian Open back to the European Tour. The Belgian Open was reintroduced under the name Belgian Knockout.

The first edition of the Belgian Knockout, which was the 53rd edition of the Belgian Open, took place from 17 to 20 May 2018 at Rinkven International Golf Club, Schilde, Antwerp. In the final, the Spaniard Adrián Otaegui won against Frenchman Benjamin Hébert after four match days. David Drysdale took third place after winning against James Heath.

In 2021, it was announced that the tournament would make a return in 2022 and would revert to a stroke play event. It was sponsored by Soudal, and renamed as the Soudal Open.

Format in 2018 and 2019
There are two rounds of stroke-play on the first two days. The top 64 and ties are credited with prize money and are declared to have advanced under Tour rules.  However, in case of a tie for 64th place, there is a playoff if players are tied for 64th place to determine who advances to the knockout stages.  Players eliminated in the playoff earn 65th place prize money and are credited with making the cut ("MDF").

In the knock-out stage there are six rounds, each match being over nine holes of stroke-play. Players are seeded based on their position after 36 holes. On the first day of knockout there are three rounds. Half the players use the front nine holes, the other half use the back nine. If the two players are tied after 9 holes there is a sudden-death playoff. There is also a 3rd/4th place playoff. Placings for those who didn't reach the semi-finals are decided firstly by the knockout round reached and, for those who lost in the same round, on their score in the opening 36 holes.

Two major changes will be implemented in 2019 for the event.  In order to remove a potential advantage/disadvantage that may happen with some groups, the 144 players are now grouped in two sections of 72 players each.  One section plays on the first morning and the second afternoon, the other on the first afternoon and second morning.  The top 32 players qualify from each section, each section having a separate playoff if required.  The second change applies to the first knockout round.  The top 16 players will earn an advantage headed to the first knockout round.  If their first-round match is tied after nine holes, they automatically advance.

Winners

In 1957 Hunt (137) beat Rees (145) by 8 strokes in a 36-hole playoff. In 1935 Branch (145) beat Van Donck (149) by 4 strokes in a 36-hole playoff. In 1912 Duncan (70) beat Ray (71) and Ball (78) in an 18-hole playoff, played the same evening.

Notes

References

External links
Coverage on the European Tour's official site
List of winners from 1910 to 1999 from golftoday.co.uk

European Tour events
Golf tournaments in Belgium
Recurring sporting events established in 1910
1910 establishments in Belgium